In enzymology, a glutamate—ethylamine ligase is an enzyme that catalyzes the chemical reaction

ATP + L-glutamate + ethylamine  ADP + phosphate + N5-ethyl-L-glutamine

The 3 substrates of this enzyme are ATP, L-glutamate, and ethylamine, whereas its 3 products are ADP, phosphate, and N5-ethyl-L-glutamine.

This enzyme belongs to the family of ligases, specifically those forming carbon-nitrogen bonds as acid-D-ammonia (or amine) ligases (amide synthases).  The systematic name of this enzyme class is L-glutamate:ethylamine ligase (ADP-forming). Other names in common use include N5-ethyl-L-glutamine synthetase, theanine synthetase, and N5-ethylglutamine synthetase.

References

 
 
 

EC 6.3.1
Enzymes of unknown structure